The Railroad Revival Tour was a music tour that featured popular roots, folk, country, rock, bluegrass and Americana acts in 2011.

The musicians travelled between shows across the American Southwest in 17 vintage train cars from the 1940s, 1950s and 1960s. The outdoor concert locations, sometimes attracting over 10,000 fans, are often a stone's throw from the train. The bands eat, sleep and engage in impromptu jam sessions on the train between stops, giving them a chance to collaborate. On stage at night, they often join in on each other's sets, sometimes bringing around 30 musicians up to create a rare and rowdy performance. The organic American roots feeling of the tour also prompts participating musicians to honor U.S. railway history, like Mumford & Sons' tribute to Woody Guthrie in 2011.

The tour included performances by Mumford & Sons, Edward Sharpe and the Magnetic Zeros, and Old Crow Medicine Show. A documentary, called Big Easy Express, directed by Emmett Malloy premiered at SXSW 2012 and won a Grammy Award in 2013. The film is currently available on iTunes and DVD/Blu-ray Disc.

Railroad Revival Tour bands Mumford & Sons, Edward Sharpe and the Magnetic Zeros, and Old Crow Medicine Show closed the show together at every stop with "This Train Is Bound for Glory." 

The 2012 tour was slated to include performances by Willie Nelson, Band of Horses, Jamey Johnson, and John Reilly and Friends. The tour was cancelled for 2012.

Railroad Revival Tour 2011
The tour included performances by Mumford & Sons, Edward Sharpe and the Magnetic Zeros, and Old Crow Medicine Show.

References

External links
Railroad Revival Tour Official Site

2011 establishments in the United States
2011 concert tours
Music festivals in the United States
Recurring events established in 2011